Mycena metata is a species of fungus in the family Mycenaceae found in Europe. It is inedible.

References

External links

metata
Fungi of Europe
Fungi described in 1821
Taxa named by Elias Magnus Fries